The 1831 National Republican National Convention was held to determine the presidential ticket of the National Republican Party in the 1832 United States presidential election. The convention was held in Baltimore, Maryland in December 1831. The party nominated Senator Henry Clay of Kentucky for president and former Representative John Sergeant of Pennsylvania for vice president.

The 1831 National Republican National Convention was the first U.S. presidential nominating convention held by a major party, though a third party, the Anti-Masonic Party, had held a presidential nominating convention earlier in 1831. 155 delegates from 18 of the 24 states attended the convention. Clay was the unanimous choice for president of the party's delegates. He was the first sitting member of the United States Senate to be nominated for president.

In the 1832 presidential election, Clay was defeated by President Andrew Jackson of the Democratic Party. After the 1832 election, the National Republican Party, the Anti-Masonic Party, and other opponents of Jackson coalesced into the Whig Party. Thus, the 1831 convention was the only national convention ever held by the National Republican Party.

See also 
 1832 Democratic National Convention
 1832 United States presidential election
 1839 Whig National Convention

References 

1832 United States presidential election
1831 in Maryland
1831 conferences
Whig National Convention